Elsie may refer to:

People and fictional characters
 Elsie (given name), a list of people and fictional characters
 Lily Elsie (1886–1952), English actress and singer born Elsie Hodder
 Robert Elsie (1950–2017), Canadian expert in Albanian culture and affairs
 Hahm Eun-jung (born 1988), South Korean singer and actress known professional as Elsie, a member of T-ara

Places

United States
 Elsie, Kentucky, an unincorporated community
 Elsie, Michigan, a village
 Elsie, Nebraska, village
 Lake Elsie, in North Dakota

Canada
 Elsie Island, Nunavut
 Elsie Lake, in British Columbia

Music
 Elsie (album), the 2011 début album by The Horrible Crowes
 Elsie (musical)
 "Elsie", a song from Elsie (musical)

Other uses
 USS Elsie III (SP-708), a United States Navy patrol vessel in commission from 1917 to 1919, later USC&G Elsie III, a United States Coast and Geodetic Survey ship from 1919 to 1944
 Elsie (robot), an autonomous robot built by William Grey Walter
 Elsie mine, also known as the C3A1 mine, a type of anti-personnel mine
 Elsie, nickname for Searchlight Control radar (SLC radar)
 Elsie Refuge, the first women's shelter to protect women from domestic violence in Australia

See also
 Elsie-Dee, a Marvel Comics ally of Wolverine
 ELSI (disambiguation)